The Outsider is the name of three different characters appearing in American comic books published by DC Comics.

Publication history
The Pre-Crisis version of the Outsider first appeared as an unseen character in Detective Comics #334 and was created by Gardner Fox and Carmine Infantino.

The Flashpoint version of the Outsider first appeared in Flashpoint: The Outsider #1 and was created by James Robinson and Javi Fernandez. 

The Earth-3 Outsider first appeared in Justice League (vol. 2) #6 and was created by Geoff Johns and Jim Lee.

Fictional character biography

Pre-Crisis
Alfred Pennyworth was seemingly killed when he pushed Batman and Robin out of the way of a boulder. It was revealed that he had been revived by a scientist named Brandon Crawford. His attempt at regeneration resulted in a dramatic change: Alfred awoke from his apparent death sporting pasty white skin with circular markings, superhuman powers, including telekinesis, and a desire to destroy Batman and Robin. Calling himself the Outsider, he indirectly battles the Dynamic Duo. Outsider sends coffins with Batman and Robin automatons to deliver the message to Bruce Wayne and Dick Grayson. Tracking the delivery of the coffins, they have to battle off the Grasshopper Gang, then they find fingerprints belonging to the Outsider which shockingly belong to Alfred Pennyworth. Batman and Robin track down the Outsider to his hideout and battle him to a standstill before the strange creature can turn both Batman and Robin into coffins themselves. Knocking the Outsider out, Batman puts him on a machine which bombards him with radiation once more. This restores Alfred back to normal and in good health, but with no memory of his Outsider identity.

After this, Alfred occasionally relapsed into the Outsider identity to face down the Dynamic Duo, other members of the Batman family and the Outsiders, but has not done so since Crisis on Infinite Earths.

Flashpoint
A new version of the Outsider appears in the Flashpoint reality. Michael Desai was born in Chandigarh, India, an infant metahuman with alabaster skin and superhuman durability. When his mother died during his birth (for which Desai's father blamed him), Desai created a sinkhole with a three-mile radius which killed thousands of people and left him the only survivor. How Desai accomplished this feat (and the extent of this power) is currently unknown. Years later, Michael adopted the alias of "the Outsider" (as he is both "outside" the law and the human race) and accumulates considerable wealth through (implied) illegal activities. This allows Desai to elevate India's status as a world power, turning the country into a multinational criminal operation completely under his control. The Outsider has also made many enemies; Rising Sun and Mister and Misses Terrific tried to assassinate him after Desai framed them when they revealed some of his illegal activities. The Outsider then killed all three would-be assassins and set out for the man who hired them. Desai is also engaged in a manhunt to find (and capture) a teenage electricity-based meta-human named Blackout, whom he believes can efficiently power mainland India with his abilities. Later, the Outsider was invited by the heroes of Earth to a meeting (arranged by Cyborg) about creating a group of heroes to deal with the Amazon-Atlantean War. The Outsider's reasons for supporting the heroes revolve around maintaining his empire; he responds to the threat of war by saying: "War is bad for business. My business". When Batman refuses to join the team, the Outsider declines as well, stating "the Outsider is out". Desai is revealed to have longevity, since he is shown to be active in Indian criminal and political affairs since the late 1970s. In 1979, the Outsider quelled the Bombay riots by manipulating and subsequently killing the crime leaders responsible for the violence, uniting their organizations under his leadership. In 1996, the Outsider captured Isis in his Siberian Express on Novaya Zemlya in a bid to blackmail Black Adam into selling Desai his home country, Khandaq. When negotiating terms for Isis' release, the Outsider attacked and defeated Black Adam with Durlan technology. The Outsider then shot Adam and threw him off the Siberian Express to join Isis as his trophy-prisoner. In the present day, the Outsider is shown interrogating the warden at the prison from which the assassins escaped. Although the warden claimed to know nothing about the prisoners' breakout, the Outsider shoots him and has his family sold into slavery in retribution for his incompetence. The Outsider's investigation then leads him to Khandaq, where he uncovers an encryption key which links Blackout to the assassination attempt. Later, Desai apparently confronts Blackout, but he realizes that the man he is fighting is not Blackout but J'onn J'onzz in disguise. In 1985, the Outsider is revealed to have kept J'onn J'onzz captive in a secret research facility after stealing Doctor Erdel's teleportation device. After studying him and learning his weaknesses, the Outsider sold J'onn to Russia; he subsequently escaped and seized the country. In the present day, after the Outsider talks with J'onn about the past, J'onn admits to seeking revenge against Desai for torturing him and tries to kill him. During the battle, the Outsider uses a salvaged teleportation device to trap J'onn within the Multiverse. After unsuccessfully questioning J'onn about future assassination attempts, the Outsider closed the device with J'onn trapped inside, cutting him in half. Later, the Outsider returns to his base and contacts the heroes to join the assault on New Themyscira and arrives on the scene to attack in the Atlantean-Amazon War.

The New 52
In 2011, "The New 52" rebooted the DC universe. a man known as the Outsider is introduced as the leader/benefactor of the Secret Society of Super Villains, where he was depicted as a pale man clad in purple. The Secret Society's origins are first seen in Justice League #6 when Professor Ivo and the "Outsider" meet to discuss the growing superhero community. The Secret Society is officially uncovered five years later by the Green Arrow (who is injured while trying to infiltrate the organization under the name Dark Hunter). The Outsider is seen looking to recruit members to the Secret Society, examining photographs of the different supervillains. During Catwoman's attempt to infiltrate the Society, she is captured by the Outsider, who proceeds to shoot her in the head. He also sends a message along their communication coins to Dr. Light, knocking him back in a burst of light, thus giving him his powers. It is revealed that Catwoman is actually the Martian Manhunter and the two pursue the Outsider. When they find him, the Martian Manhunter attempts to read his mind, only for the "Outsider" to block the Manhunter's access and tell him that it was nice to see him "again".

During the Trinity War storyline, The Outsider watches the news of the Justice League and the Justice League of America fighting in Kahndaq, thinking to himself that everyone will actually believe that Superman killed Doctor Light under his own power. He also states that Pandora is in the open and will soon belong to the Secret Society. The Outsider, having captured Madame Xanadu, tells her that the Justice Leagues and the Trinity of Sin are all pieces in his game, with Superman and the Question (referred to as the pawns), Batman, the Phantom Stranger, and Wonder Woman (referred to as the knights), all moving away from Pandora (referred to as the queen) leaving her unprotected. Madame Xanadu retorts that she does not need to see the future to know that the Justice League will defeat him, to which he replies that he has already won since he has a mole in the Justice League. The Outsider recounts how he arrived on Prime Earth. During the Justice League's battle with Darkseid, the barriers between universes was weakened which allowed him and another individual to escape their world, but his master did not make it. Ever since, he began recruiting many of the League's enemies to create the Secret Society in preparation for his master's arrival, searched for Pandora's Box, and planted an agent within the Justice League. He gets his hands on the box and tells the heroes that the box is not magic, but science, that was created on his world and can only be opened by someone from his world. He explains that the box opens a gateway to another universe, his homeworld; the birthplace of evil. It is revealed that the Outsider is actually from Earth-3 and is that world's version of Alfred Pennyworth who works as the butler to Owlman as he and his fellow Crime Syndicate members Ultraman, Superwoman, Power Ring, Johnny Quick, and Deathstorm arrive while Sea King didn't survive the trip.

During the "Forever Evil" storyline, Pandora tries to get answers from the Outsider on how to reopen the portal to Earth-3, but he points out that she is asking him the wrong type of questions. He then reveals to her that the Seven Deadly Sins, supposedly released when she touched the box, would have appeared on Prime Earth no matter what, meaning the Council of Eternity cursed her for no reason. The Outsider then blows up the Watchtower, as Pandora teleports away. In a flashback, it was revealed that Outsider worked with Thomas Wayne Jr. where they caused the death of Thomas Wayne Sr., Martha Wayne, and Bruce Wayne where Owlman later mentioned that his father was weak. Outsider contacts Owlman to inform him that Grid placed Nightwing in a "Murder Machine" (originally intended for Doomsday). When Grid informs the Outsider of the intrusion, he goes to protect their hooded prisoner over Nightwing. The Outsider is killed by Black Manta.

See also
 List of Batman family enemies

References

External links
 Outsider (Pre-Crisis version) at DC Comics Wiki
 Outsider (Flashpoint version) at DC Comics Wiki
 Outsider (Alfred Pennyworth of Earth 3) at DC Comics Wiki
 Outsider (Flashpoint version) at Comicvine

DC Comics supervillains
DC Comics metahumans
Comics characters introduced in 1966
Comics characters introduced in 2011
Characters created by Gardner Fox
Characters created by Geoff Johns
Characters created by Jim Lee
Characters created by Carmine Infantino